1994–95 Estonian Cup was the fourth season of the Estonian football knockout tournament.

Round 1

Round 2

Quarter-finals

Lantana-Marlekor advanced to the next round 14–2 on aggregate.

Flora advanced to the next round 6–2 on aggregate.

Sadam advanced to the next round 8–2 on aggregate.

Trans advanced to the next round 3–1 on aggregate.

Semi-finals

Flora advanced to the next round 6–0 on aggregate.

Lantana-Marlekor advanced to the next round 3–1 on aggregate.

Final

References

Estonian Cup seasons
Cup
Cup
Estonian